Triopha catalinae, commonly known as the sea clown triopha or sea clown, is a species of colorful sea slug called a nudibranch. Sea clowns are a  shell-less marine, gastronomic mollusk in the taxonomic family Polyceridae.

The species' Latin name is named after Santa Catalina Island, California.

Distribution
This species lives in the Western Pacific from Alaska to Mexico, and has also been found in Japan and South Korea.

Life habits
This nudibranch grazes on bryozoans.

References

External links

 

Polyceridae
Molluscs of the Pacific Ocean
Marine molluscs of Asia
Gastropods of Asia
Molluscs of North America
Molluscs of the United States
Fauna of the Channel Islands of California
~
Western North American coastal fauna
Gastropods described in 1863